Julius Sacrovir was a member of the gens Julia. Alongside Julius Florus, a leader of the Treveri, he led the Aedui tribe in Gaul in a revolt against the Romans. After being defeated in battle Sacrovir fled to, and was killed in Augustodunum.

Gallic Revolt 
Sacrovir, Florus, and other Gauls rebelled against the Romans in 21 AD due to their prohibitions of Gaulic druidism, and their bankrupting of Gaulic nobles through large confiscations of wealth. Their plan was to use Florus to rouse the Belgae, while Sacrovir roused the rest of the Gauls. Florus began the war by raising a regiment of Treviri horsemen, which he would use to massacre Roman merchants. His army was met by Julius Indus at the Ardennes Forest; during this battle Florus was killed. At the beginning Sacrovir wished to feign an alliance with the Romans. Leading to him fighting against the Gauls. Sacrovir would later raise an army of around fifty thousand men to take back the city of Augustodunum, which was the capital of his tribe. In response Roman general Acillius Aviola raised a Cohort of six hundred soldiers and went to subdue the Gauls. He was successful in several provinces. Another commander named Visellius Varo quelled an insurrection at Tours. Gaius Silius, who was an officer in the Legio I Germanica, was the general who defeated Sacrovir in battle. Afterwards, he fled to Augustodunum, where he was later found and killed. Julius Sacrovir's defeat was commemorated by a triumphal arch.

References

Julii
1st-century rulers in Europe

1st-century BC Gallo-Roman people
1st-century Romans
1st-century Gallo-Roman people